= Zad-Shahapur =

- Village
- Location in Karnataka, India Zad-Shahapur (India)
- Coordinates: 15°45′55.96″N 74°29′20.9″E
- Country: India
- State: Karnataka
- District: Belgaum
- Talukas: Belgaum

Languages
  - Official: Kannada
- Time zone: UTC+5:30 (IST)

Zad-Shahapur is a village in Belgaum district in the southern state of Karnataka, India.
